Nicolas Alnoudji (born 9 December 1979) is a Cameroonian former professional footballer who played as a midfielder. Between 2002 and 2002, he made 17 appearances for the Cameroon national team.

International career
Alnoudji played for Cameroon national team and was a participant at the 2000 Olympic Games (where he won a gold medal) and at the 2002 FIFA World Cup. He was also part of the Cameroon team who won the 2002 African Cup of Nations.

Career statistics

References

1979 births
Living people
People from Garoua
Association football midfielders
Cameroonian footballers
Cameroon international footballers
Cameroonian expatriate footballers
Olympic footballers of Cameroon
Olympic gold medalists for Cameroon
Footballers at the 2000 Summer Olympics
2001 FIFA Confederations Cup players
2002 FIFA World Cup players
2002 African Cup of Nations players
Çaykur Rizespor footballers
Süper Lig players
Cameroonian expatriate sportspeople in Turkey
Ligue 1 players
Ligue 2 players
SC Bastia players
CS Sedan Ardennes players
R.A.E.C. Mons players
CS Pandurii Târgu Jiu players
US Créteil-Lusitanos players
Cameroonian expatriate sportspeople in Belgium
Al-Ahli Saudi FC players
Saudi Professional League players
Al Ain FC players
Al-Sailiya SC players
Cameroonian expatriate sportspeople in Romania
Cameroonian expatriate sportspeople in Saudi Arabia
Liga I players
Expatriate footballers in Romania
Coton Sport FC de Garoua players
JS Saint-Pierroise players
S.C. Olhanense players
Expatriate footballers in Réunion
Expatriate footballers in France
Expatriate footballers in Turkey
Expatriate footballers in Portugal
Expatriate footballers in Belgium
Expatriate footballers in Qatar
Expatriate footballers in Saudi Arabia
Expatriate footballers in the United Arab Emirates
Olympic medalists in football
Medalists at the 2000 Summer Olympics
Qatar Stars League players
UAE Pro League players